Martin Sinclair may refer to:

 Martin Sinclair (footballer) (born 1986), British Paralympic  footballer
 Martin Sinclair (sport shooter), British sport shooter